Colchester United Football Club is an English association football club based in Colchester, Essex that currently competes in Football League One. The Colchester United Player of the Year award is voted for annually by Colchester United's supporters to name a player who has been the club's best performer over the course of a campaign.

Mike Walker won the award three times, in 1980, 1981 and 1982, and was also the first to win the award in consecutive seasons. Tom Eastman matched this feat in 2018, having also won in 2014 and 2015. He surpassed this record to win a fourth award in 2020. Five other players have won the award twice since the inaugural award in 1965.

Three players who won the award later went on to manage the club, including Steve Wignall, Mike Walker and Steve Whitton.

Key

List of winners

Wins by playing position

Wins by nationality

See also
List of Colchester United F.C. seasons
List of Colchester United F.C. records and statistics

Notes

1. : The official "Level" of competition in the structure of the English league system.
2. : Appearances and goals from the season the player won the award, including appearances and goals in The Football League and play-offs, Football Conference, FA Cup, Football League Cup, Associate Members Cup/Football League Trophy, FA Trophy, Conference League Cup and Watney Cup.

References

Player of the Year
Colchester United Player of the Year
Association football player non-biographical articles